Globe International Ltd. is an Australian footwear, clothing, and skateboard hardware company. It was founded in 1985 by three Australian brothers. Globe International's core business is divided between proprietary brands, licensed brands, and distributed brands. The company's international offices are located in Melbourne, Los Angeles, Newport Beach and San Diego, U.S.; Hossegor, France; and Shenzhen, China. It is listed on the Australian Stock Exchange.

History 

The foundation of Globe International was established in the 1980s, with the founding of Hardcore Enterprises, an Australian-based company specialising in products that appealed to the skateboard and street fashion markets. In 1985, former Australian skateboarding champions Peter and Stephen Hill, along with brother and current Globe International CEO Matt Hill, began Hardcore which would later develop into one of the world's largest skateboard distribution companies. The Hills cited that they were unsatisfied with the lack of quality skate products they required, and thus they went into business to import US skate products to Australia.

The Hills continued to promote skateboarding, writing two books on the subject and producing skate videos. Through constant promotions, tours, contests, video and magazine advertising, Hardcore became a driving force behind the skateboarding explosion during the mid-1980s in Australia and New Zealand. The first diversification company "Die Hard Pty Ltd" was founded in 1987 as a clothing and accessories division of the business. Die Hard's first licensed label was Vision Streetwear.

Die Hard went on to produce premier labels under license for the Australian and New Zealand markets such as Stüssy, Mossimo, Freshjive, Paul Frank, Eckō Unltd., Counter Culture, Split, Girl Star, Undergirl and World Industries. The Hills also co-founded the streetwear brand Mooks which also operated under the Die Hard umbrella.  Die Hard became known as Globe International's Streetwear Division and was one of the largest suppliers of branded youth clothing in Australia and New Zealand when it was sold to Pacific Brands in 2006.

In 1995, Globe International established its US operation in Los Angeles, where the Globe brand is now a part of the American boardsports sub-culture and a key supplier to major retailers of boardsports apparel, footwear and skateboard hardgoods.

In 2001, Globe International listed on the Australian Stock Exchange and achieved the Initial Public Offer goals. In 2002, Globe International acquired Kubic Marketing, a holding company that owned World Industries and Dwindle Distribution, which at the time, was the parent company for skateboard brands such as Enjoi, Blind, Darkstar and Tensor. Acquiring Dwindle, a company founded by professional skateboarders Rodney Mullen and Steve Rocco, made Globe International one of the world's biggest skateboard companies. In 2003, Globe International established its European headquarters, located along the south-west surf coast of France in Hossegor.  As of 2017, the European office sells directly in the major boardsports markets of the UK, France, Germany, Spain, Portugal, Belgium, Netherlands, and Austria, among others. All other significant markets in Europe are serviced by third-party distributors.

Having established a stable of proprietary brands and an international distribution network in 2006, Globe International made a strategic decision to divest itself of its licensed Australian Streetwear Division to Pacific Brands and focus on further international expansion of the company's proprietary brands. In 2009, Globe International added to its brand portfolio by acquiring Europe's number one skateboard brand Cliché and expanding it through international markets. In 2010, Globe International re-entered the Australian streetwear market and established a new division entitled "4Front Distribution", a company that is currently responsible for the Australian distribution of brands such as Stüssy, Obey and Misfit. Globe also moved its Melbourne headquarters to the inner-city suburb of Port Melbourne during the same year, occupying a building that was formerly owned by chocolate company Cadbury's.

Globe operates its own factory to manufacture the skateboards and trucks. The DSM (Douglas Street Manufacturing) Premium Woodshop is located in Shenzhen, China, with skateboard icon Rodney Mullen closely involved in its production practices from its inception. DSM imports maple logs from Canada's Great Lakes region for the production of its decks. A 2013 TransWorld SKATEboarding article likened DSM's approach to the sourcing and treatment of wood; "as the sandwich shop that prepares all of their meat from the whole animal versus others who order their cuts from a wholesaler. DSM has the in-house butcher." DSM was first publicly announced in 2003 and caused a widespread surprised reaction in the skateboard industry, as production had previously been solely based in North America and concern was raised about job losses. Globe CEO Matt Hill, stated at the time: "When you get down to the labor issues, if we sell a lot more boards, then we’ll create jobs here (in the U.S.A.), it’ll open a lot more doors.”

In 2015, the company launched a book 'Unemployable: 30 Years of Hardcore, Skate and Street' to celebrate its 30th anniversary, and held launches in Melbourne and Los Angeles. In 2017, the company acquired the American brand, Salty Crew and in 2019, sold the Dwindle part of the business. Towards the end of 2019, the company launched an electric skateboard product, the dot board. In 2022, Globe acquired the swimwear brand It's Now Cool  and launched MilkBar bikes. As of 2023, the company operates a small number of branded "Globe" retail stores in several locations: St Kilda, Melbourne, Victoria; Hossegor, France, and Hong Kong.

Proprietary brands 
 Globe
 FXD Workwear
 Salty Crew
 Impala Skate
 dot electric skateboards
 Milkbar Bikes
 It's Now Cool

Third party brands 
 Stüssy
 Obey
 X-Large
 Almost
 Enjoi
 Darkstar
 Kryptonics
 Andalé
 Girl
 Chocolate
 Thrasher
 Flip
 Royal
 Lakai
 Alltimers
 Wreck Wheels
 The National Skateboard Co

Team

Skateboarding 
 Rodney Mullen
 David González
Gary Valentine 
 Mark Appleyard
 Ryan Decenzo
 Sammy Montano
 Vincent Milou

Surfing 
 Shaun Manners
 Dion Agius
 Taj Burrow
 CJ Hobgood
 Damien Hobgood
 Nate Tyler
 Noa Deane
 Creed McTaggart
 Brendon Gibbens
 Eric Geiselman

Snowboarding 
 David Carrier Porcheron
 Jan Petter Solberg
 Romain De Marchi

Filmography 
The company has produced numerous films and short films, incorporating both skateboarding and surfing subcultures. Between 2007 and 2010, the brand released a series of six short films entitled United By Fate, directed by Joe "Joe G" Guglielmino, and featuring all of the skate team members during that period. The inaugural episode of United By Fate featured Canadian skateboarder Paul Machnau, while the final instalment was a compilation of footage from different team members, such as Jake Duncombe, Louis Lopez and Chris Haslam.

Joe G and Globe began filming their latest surf film Strange Rumblings in Shangri La at the commencement of 2013, and were awarded the 2014 Surfer Poll Movie of the Year in December 2014. The film featured Globe team members Dion Agius, Nate Tyler, Creed McTaggart, Taj Burrow, CJ and Damien Hobgood, Yadin Nicol, Brendon Gibbons and Noa Deane in locations such as Iceland, Brazil, France, Mozambique and Indonesia.

Skateboarding videography
Canvas
Opinion
United By Fate 1–6,

Surfing videography
Somewhere, Anywhere, Everywhere
The Secret Machine
New Emissions of Light and Sound
Ungu
Year Zero
Electric Blue Heaven
 Icecream
 Strange Rumblings in Shangri La
 Cult of Freedom web series

Major events

Skateboarding
Globe World Cup Skateboarding – Melbourne, Australia 2002 
Globe World Cup Skateboarding – Melbourne, Australia 2003
Globe World Cup Skateboarding – Melbourne, Australia 2004
Globe World Cup Skateboarding – Melbourne, Australia 2005
The Global Assault!!! – Melbourne, Australia 2006
Double Stack Cash Attack – Gold Coast, Australia 2007
Slaughter at the Opera – Sydney, Australia 2008

Surfing
Globe Pro Fiji WCT Event – Tavarua Island, Fiji 2005 
Globe Pro Fiji WCT Event – Tavarua Island, Fiji 2006
Globe Pro Fiji WCT Event – Tavarua Island, Fiji 2008

Special projects 
Led by its Special Project Division, Globe has worked with other well-known brands and artists, including:

 The Clash
 Jason Ellis
 Devo
 Christies of London
 G-Shock
 Gears of War
 Splatterhouse
 Gojira
 Sekure D
 Wayne 'Rabbit' Bartholemew
 Martin Potter
 Pete Townend
 Halo X
 Neff 
 Beavis and Butt-Head
 Desillusion Magazine
 Monster Children 
 Sesame Street
 Yes. Snowboards

References

External links

Shoe brands
Clothing brands of Australia
Companies listed on the Australian Securities Exchange
Retail companies of Australia
Australian brands
Swimwear manufacturers
Skateboarding companies
Snowboarding companies
Surfwear brands
Sporting goods manufacturers of Australia
Surfing in Australia
Australian fashion
Shoe companies of Australia
Multinational companies headquartered in Australia
Clothing companies established in 1985
Hosiery brands
Sportswear brands
Manufacturing companies based in Melbourne
Skateboard shoe companies
Australian companies established in 1985